Company Business Towers is a mixed use commercial development complex (with two towers) in the city of São Paulo, Brazil, that was completed in 2013. The complex comprises high end residential units, commercial office and retail space as well as a hotel.

The project was modified and the tallest tower was not built to the originally intended height. The name of the complex was also modified, and it is currently called Brookfield Towers.

See also
List of tallest buildings in South America
List of tallest buildings in Brazil
Mirante do Vale
Altino Arantes Building

References

External links
Company Business Towers in Emporis
Company Business Towers in SkyscraperPage

Office buildings completed in 2013
Skyscrapers in São Paulo
Skyscraper office buildings in Brazil